Orgreave may refer to:

 Orgreave, South Yorkshire, a village and civil parish in England
 Orgreave Colliery, a former coal mine (which also supplied the Orgreave coking works)
 Battle of Orgreave, a violent confrontation in 1984 between police and pickets
 Orgreave, Staffordshire, a hamlet in England

See also
 Orgreave Colliery platform
 Orgreave rail accident